Erkak is a 2005 Uzbekistani drama film directed by Yusup Razykov. It was entered into the 27th Moscow International Film Festival.

Cast
 Elnur Abraev
 Lola Eltoeva

References

External links
 

2005 films
2005 drama films
Uzbekistani drama films
Uzbek-language films